Todd Downing (born July 22, 1980) is an American football coach. He has previously served as offensive coordinator for the Oakland Raiders and the Tennessee Titans. He also previously served as an assistant coach for the Minnesota Vikings, Buffalo Bills, Detroit Lions and St. Louis Rams.

Playing career
Downing played quarterback for the Minnesota Maulers, a semi-pro football team from 2000 to 2002.  Todd played Quarterback and defensive back while helping the Maulers to 3 consecutive championship games.

Coaching career

Early career
Downing received his first coaching job, and was an assistant coach for Eden Prairie High School as a 9th grade B team offensive coach. While coaching his high school, the Eagles won the Class 5A state title in 2000 over Matt Birk's Cretin Durham Hall Raiders.

Minnesota Vikings
After being offered an internship in 2001 by Chad Ostlund in Research and Development for the Minnesota Vikings, he was a Public Relations intern for 2002, a football systems analyst from 2003–04, and offensive quality control coach in 2005.

St. Louis Rams
In 2006, Downing was hired by the then St. Louis Rams to be a defensive assistant and special teams assistant coach. He would keep this job for two seasons. In 2008, Downing would become the Rams defensive quality control coach.

Detroit Lions
In 2009, Downing went to the Detroit Lions with Scott Linehan as an offensive quality control coach. He was the assistant quarterback coach in 2010 and was promoted to the quarterbacks coach role from 2011–2013. While he was coaching quarterbacks in Detroit, Matthew Stafford averaged 4,885 yards, thirty touchdowns, and seventeen interceptions from 2011–2013.

Buffalo Bills
In 2014, Downing was the Buffalo Bills' quarterback coach.

Oakland Raiders
In 2015, Downing was hired by the Oakland Raiders as their quarterbacks coach under head coach Jack Del Rio. He is credited for helping Derek Carr become the first Raiders quarterback to be selected to a Pro Bowl since 2002. On January 20, 2015, Downing was named by Pro Football Focus as Quarterbacks Coach of the Year. After coaching Raiders quarterbacks for two years, he was promoted to offensive coordinator in 2017, after the Raiders decided not to renew Bill Musgrave's contract. When he coached Carr from 2015–2016, he threw for 7,924 yards, sixty touchdowns, and nineteen interceptions with two Pro Bowl appearances.

Downing was fired on January 1, 2018, along with head coach Jack Del Rio and the rest of Del Rio's staff after dropping from 12–4 to 6–10 due to a major regression of the offense.

Minnesota Vikings (second stint)
On February 19, 2018, Downing was hired by the Minnesota Vikings as a senior offensive assistant. Following the sudden passing of Vikings offensive line coach Tony Sparano prior to training camp in 2018, tight ends coach Clancy Barone was shifted to coach the offensive line, alongside Sparano's assistant offensive line coach, Andrew Janocko. Downing was moved from senior offensive assistant to tight ends coach to fill the vacant position.

Tennessee Titans
On January 26, 2019, Downing was hired by the Tennessee Titans as their tight ends coach under head coach Mike Vrabel.

On January 29, 2021, Downing was promoted to offensive coordinator, replacing Arthur Smith, who departed to become the head coach of the Atlanta Falcons.

On January 9, 2023, the Titans head coach Mike Vrabel announced Downing had been fired.

Personal life 
Downing grew up in Eden Prairie, Minnesota. He is married to Julie, and has a son Jackson. He was involved in a DUI when driving back from a game during the 2022 season.

References

External links
 Tennessee Titans profile
 Oakland Raiders profile

1980 births
Living people
Buffalo Bills coaches
Detroit Lions coaches
Minnesota Vikings coaches
National Football League offensive coordinators
Oakland Raiders coaches
St. Louis Rams coaches
Tennessee Titans coaches
High school football coaches in Minnesota
University of Minnesota alumni
People from Eden Prairie, Minnesota